Boophis marojezensis is a species of frog in the family Mantellidae.
It is endemic to Madagascar.

Its natural habitats are subtropical or tropical moist lowland forests and rivers.
It is threatened by habitat loss.

References

External links

Boophis marojezensis - Amphibiaweb.org

marojezensis
Endemic frogs of Madagascar
Amphibians described in 1994
Taxonomy articles created by Polbot